Raj Kumar Rinwa (born 24 June 1953) is an Indian politician of the Bharatiya Janata Party from Churu district in Rajasthan, India. He was a Member of the Rajasthan Legislative Assembly from Ratangarh constituency in 2003, 2008 and 2013.

Early Life  
Raj Kumar Rinwa was born on 24 June 1953 at Ratangarh in Churu district. His father's name is Prahlad Rai Rinwa and mother's name is Sajna Devi. He has studied B.com and LLB. In 2003, he became MLA for the first time by contesting as an independent from Ratangarh assembly.

Political career 
Rinwa has won the assembly elections thrice. In 2003, he contested as an independent and defeated BJP's veteran leader Harishankar Bhabhada and Congress's Pt. Jai Devprasad Indoriya. He became the MLA of Ratangarh for two consecutive terms in 2008 and 2013. In 2013, he was also a minister in Vasundhara Raje's government.

References 

1953 births
Bharatiya Janata Party politicians from Rajasthan
Rajasthan MLAs 2003–2008
State cabinet ministers of Rajasthan
People from Churu district
Living people
Rajasthan MLAs 2008–2013
Rajasthan MLAs 2013–2018